Amadou M’Bagnick M'Baye (born 31 May 1964) is a Senegalese sprinter. He competed in the men's 100 metres at the 1988 Summer Olympics.

References

External links
 

1964 births
Living people
Athletes (track and field) at the 1988 Summer Olympics
Athletes (track and field) at the 1992 Summer Olympics
Senegalese male sprinters
Olympic athletes of Senegal
Place of birth missing (living people)